Heteropoma is a genus of minute, salt marsh snails with an operculum, aquatic gastropod mollusks, or micromollusks, in the family Assimineidae.

Species
Species in the genus Heteropoma include:
 Heteropoma fulvum (Quadras & Möllendorff, 1894) 
 Heteropoma glabratum
 Heteropoma pyramis
 Heteropoma quadrasi
 Heteropoma tuberculatum
 Heteropoma turritum

References

Assimineidae
Taxonomy articles created by Polbot